Al-Badr ("the full moon") is a militant group operating in the Kashmir region. The group was allegedly formed by the Pakistani Inter-Services Intelligence (ISI) in June 1998. It is believed the group was encouraged by the ISI to operate independently from their previous umbrella group, Hizb-ul-Mujahideen (HM). Prior to the group's separation from HM, they participated in the fighting in Afghanistan in 1990 as part of Gulbuddin Hekmatyar's Hizb-l-Islami (HIG) alongside other anti-Soviet Afghan mujihadeen. India and the United States have declared it a terrorist organisation and banned it.

Foundation and separation
The group was originally led by Arfeen Bhai, also known as Jannisar or Lukmaan, when it separated in 1998 and is currently led by Bahkt Zameen Khan.  In 2002, Zameen declared jihad against the U.S. forces in Afghanistan after being responsible for prior attacks against coalition forces there beginning in 2001. Al-Badr went on further in 2002 to order all women police in the Rajouri District of Kashmir to quit their jobs by mid-January the next year. The group has stated membership in the United Jihad Council (UJC), a coalition of Pakistan-based militants who are active in the Jammu Kashmir region. They have been linked to Jamaat-e-Islami and alleged to have connection with al-Qaeda. The groups stated purpose is to liberate the Indian states of Jammu and Kashmir to be merged with Pakistan. Al-Badr opposes negotiations to end the violence in Kashmir and opposes the Line of Control (LoC) and calls for the strengthening of the jihad.

Designation as terrorist organisation
Al-Badr was banned by India under The Unlawful Activities (Prevention) Act, 2004. On 27 April 2005 State Department of United States Government identified Al-Badr as a terrorist organisation in its list of 40 Foreign Terrorist Organisations. Al-Badr is currently on the U.S. State Department list of Designated Foreign Terrorist Organisations.

Location
The Islamic fundamentalist group Al-Badr operates covert Al Badr training camps in Pakistan to train Pakistani civilians to serve as fighters in the conflict in Kashmir.
Group has training camps in the Mansehra area of North West Frontier Province (NWFP) in Pakistan, and in Kotli and Muzaffarabad in Azad Kashmir.

In the 1990s, militants trained at al-Badr camp in the use of RDX and C4 explosives. Shaukat Ahmed Khan, the author of an article about the camps, in the Times of India, said he was kidnapped from his home in India by recruiters for the camp;  and that when he made clear he wasn't interested in fighting on behalf of Al Badr those running the camp cut out his tongue, and cut off his right hand.  He said they spared his life because he was a fellow Muslim.

Militant activity
It is believed the group has been weakened in recent years due to increased presence of Indian security forces along the Line of Control (LoC) that separates India from Pakistan. Indian security forces gauge the strength of al-Badr to be between 200 with 120 of those forces being foreign mercenaries. Al-Badr is currently one of only two Kashmiri separatist groups that employ suicide squads as a tactic, the other being Lashkar-e-Tayyeba.

On 27 October 2006, two members of al-Badr were apprehended in Mysore in what Indian police are calling a foiled terror attack. Mohd Ali Hussain and Mohd Fahad were captured carrying a laptop, chemicals often used for creating improvised explosive devices (IEDs), detonators, an AK-47 rifle, a pistol, a cell phone, a digital camera and passports as well as sketches of the state legislature building, 'Vidhan Sabha'.

On 4 June 2018 Al-Badr took the responsibility for grenade attacks in Pulwama injuring 23 people, including eight security personnel.

See also
Hizbul Mujahideen
Lashkar e Taiba
Soviet-Afghan war
Afghan Civil War (1989-1992)

References

1998 establishments in Jammu and Kashmir
Organizations established in 1998
Jihadist groups in Jammu and Kashmir
Kashmir
Organizations based in Asia designated as terrorist
Jihadist groups in Pakistan
Terrorist training camps in Pakistan
Organisations designated as terrorist by India
Organizations designated as terrorist by the United States